Międzygórze may refer to the following places in Poland:
Międzygórze, Lower Silesian Voivodeship (south-west Poland)
Międzygórze, Pomeranian Voivodeship (north Poland)
Międzygórze, Lesser Poland Voivodeship (south Poland)